Itneg is a South-Central Cordilleran dialect continuum found in the island of Luzon, Philippines. This language and Ilocano are spoken by the Itneg people (sometimes also referred to as the "Tingguian people") in Abra.

Several ethnic-Itneg dialects are taxonomically part of the neighboring Kalinga language.

Locations and dialects
Ethnologue reports the following locations for each of the five Itneg languages.

Binongan Itneg: Licuan-Baay, Abra. 7,500 speakers.
Inlaod Itneg: a few villages in Peñarrubia, Lagangilang, Danglas, and Langiden municipalities, Abra. 9,000 speakers.
Maeng Itneg: Luba, Tubo, and Villaviciosa municipalities, Abra. 18,000 speakers.
Masadiit Itneg: Sallapadan, Bucloc, and Boliney municipalities, Abra; also in the western border strip of Kalinga Province. 7,500 speakers. Dialects are Masadiit Boliney and Masadiit Sallapadan.
Moyadan Itneg: Abra. 12,000 speakers.

However, Ronald Himes (1997) recognizes two dialects for Itneg, namely Binongan (eastern) and Inlaod (western).

References

Languages of Abra (province)
South–Central Cordilleran languages